The ancient site of Ashkelon, today known as the archaeological site of Tel Ashkelon, was the oldest and largest seaport in Canaan, part of the pentapolis (a grouping of five cities) of the Philistines, north of Gaza and south of Jaffa.

History

Neolithic period

It is dated by Radiocarbon dating to  7900 bp (uncalibrated), to the poorly known Pre-Pottery Neolithic C phase of the Neolithic. It was discovered and excavated in 1954 by French archaeologist Jean Perrot. A final excavation report was published in 2008.

In the site over a hundred fireplaces and hearths were found and numerous pits, but no solid architecture, except for one wall. Various phases of occupation were found, one atop the other, with sterile layers of sea sand between them. This indicates that the site was occupied on a seasonal basis.

The main finds were enormous quantities of around 100,000 animal bones and around 20,000 flint artifacts. Usually at Neolithic sites flints far outnumber animal bones. The bones belong to domesticated and non-domesticated animals. When all aspects of this site are taken into account, it appears to have been used by pastoral nomads for meat processing. The nearby sea could supply salt necessary for the conservation of meat.

Canaanite settlement

The city was originally built on a sandstone outcropping and has a good underground water supply. It was relatively large as an ancient city with as many as 15,000 people living inside the walls. The thickness of the walls was so great that the mudbrick city gate had a stone-lined,  tunnel-like barrel vault, coated with white plaster, to support the superstructure: it is the oldest such vault ever found. Later Roman and Islamic fortifications, faced with stone, followed the same footprint, a vast semicircle protecting Ashkelon on the land side. On the sea it was defended by a high natural bluff.

Images of calves and bulls were associated with the worship of the Canaanite gods El and Baal.

Middle Bronze II
Ashkelon reached its peak with a population of about 15,000 and a city wall enclosing some 60 ha. In the early MB IIA, the Egyptians mainly sent their ships further north to Lebanon (Byblos). In the late MB IIA, Ashkelon phases 14-10 can be compared with Tell ed-Dab'a stratums H-D/1. Contacts with Egypt increased in the late 12th Dynasty and early 13th Dynasty when maritime trade flourished.

Ashkelon is mentioned in the Egyptian Execration Texts of the 11th dynasty as "Asqanu."

Late Bronze
Thutmosid Period

Beginning in the time of Thutmose III (1479-1425 BC) the city was under Egyptian control, under a local governor.

Amarna Period

In the Amarna letters ( 1350 BC), there are seven letters to and from Ashkelon's (Ašqaluna) king Yidya, and the Egyptian pharaoh. One letter from the pharaoh to Yidya was discovered in the early 1900s.

Ramesside Period

During the reign of Ramesses II the southern Levant was the frontier of the epic war against the Hittites in Syria. In addition the Sea Peoples attacked and rebellions occurred. These events coincide with a downturn in climatic conditions starting around 1250 BC onwards, ultimately causing the Late Bronze to collapse. On the death of Ramesses II, turmoil and rebellion increased in the southern Levant. The king Merneptah faced a series of uprisings, as told in the Merneptah Stele. The Pharaoh notes putting down a rebellion in the city of Ashkelon. Further north, the King Jabin of Hazor tried to fight for independence with Mycenaean mercenaries - Merneptah laying waste the grain fields in the Valley of Yizreel to starve out the northern rebellion. These events contributed to the fall of the 19th dynasty.

Philistine settlement
The Philistines conquered Canaanite Ashkelon about 1150 BCE. Their earliest pottery, types of structures and inscriptions are similar to the early Greek urbanised centre at Mycenae in mainland Greece, adding weight to the hypothesis that the Philistines were one of the populations among the "Sea Peoples" that upset cultures throughout the eastern Mediterranean at that time.

Ashkelon became one of the five Philistine cities that were constantly warring with the Israelites and later the United Kingdom of Israel and successive Kingdom of Judah. According to Herodotus, its temple of Venus was the oldest of its kind, imitated even in Cyprus, and he mentions that this temple was pillaged by marauding Scythians during the time of their sway over the Medes (653–625 BCE). As it was the last of the Philistine cities to hold out against Babylonian king Nebuchadnezzar II. When it fell in 604 BCE, burnt and destroyed and its people taken into exile, the Philistine era was over.

Persian, Hellenistic and Roman periods

Ashkelon was soon rebuilt. Until the conquest of Alexander the Great, Ashkelon's inhabitants were influenced by the dominant Persian culture. It is in this archaeological layer that excavations have found dog burials. It is believed the dogs may have had a sacred role; however, evidence is not conclusive. After the conquest of Alexander in the 4th century BCE, Ashkelon was an important free city and Hellenistic seaport.

It had mostly friendly relations with the Hasmonean kingdom and Herodian kingdom of Judea, in the 2nd and 1st centuries BCE. In a significant case of an early witch-hunt, during the reign of the Hasmonean queen Salome Alexandra, the court of Simeon ben Shetach sentenced to death eighty women in Ashkelon who had been charged with sorcery. Herod the Great, who became a client king of Rome over Judea and its environs in 30 BCE, had not received Ashkelon, yet he built monumental buildings there: bath houses, elaborate fountains and large colonnades. A discredited tradition suggests Ashkelon was his birthplace. In 6 CE, when a Roman imperial province was set in Judea, overseen by a lower-rank governor, Ashkelon was moved directly to the higher jurisdiction of the governor of Syria province.

The city remained loyal to Rome during the Great Revolt, 66–70 CE.

Byzantine period

The city of Ascalon appears on a fragment of the 6th-century Madaba Map.

The bishops of Ascalon whose names are known include Sabinus, who was at the First Council of Nicaea in 325, and his immediate successor, Epiphanius. Auxentius took part in the First Council of Constantinople in 381, Jobinus in a synod held in Lydda in 415, Leontius in both the Robber Council of Ephesus in 449 and the Council of Chalcedon in 451. Bishop Dionysius, who represented Ascalon at a synod in Jerusalem in 536, was on another occasion called upon to pronounce on the validity of a baptism with sand in waterless desert and sent the person to be baptized in water.

No longer a residential bishopric, Ascalon is today listed by the Catholic Church as a titular see.

Early Islamic period

During the Muslim conquest of Palestine begun in  633–634, Ascalon (called Asqalan by the Arabs) became one of the last Byzantine cities in the region to fall. It may have been temporarily occupied by Amr ibn al-As, but definitively surrendered to Mu'awiya ibn Abi Sufyan (who later founded the Umayyad Caliphate) not long after he captured the Byzantine district capital of Caesarea in  640. The Byzantines reoccupied Asqalan during the Second Muslim Civil War (680–692), but the Umayyad caliph Abd al-Malik recaptured and fortified it. A son of Caliph Sulayman, whose family resided in Palestine, was buried in the city. An inscription found in the city indicates that the Abbasid caliph al-Mahdi ordered the construction of a mosque with a minaret in Asqalan in 772.

Asqalan prospered under the Fatimid Caliphate and contained a mint and secondary naval base. Along with a few other coastal towns in Palestine, it remained in Fatimid hands when most of Islamic Syria was conquered by the Seljuks. However, during this period, Fatimid rule over Asqalan was periodically reduced to nominal authority over the city's governor. In 1091, a couple of years after a campaign by grand vizier Badr al-Jamali to reestablish Fatimid control over the region, the head of Husayn ibn Ali (a grandson of the Islamic prophet Muhammad) was "rediscovered", prompting Badr to order the construction of a new mosque and mashhad (shrine or mausoleum) to hold the relic, known as the Shrine of Husayn's Head. (According to another source, the shrine was built in 1098 by the Fatimid vizier al-Afdal Shahanshah.) The mausoleum was described as the most magnificent building in Ashkelon. In the British Mandate period it was a "large maqam on top of a hill" with no tomb, but a fragment of a pillar showing the place where the head had been buried. In July 1950, the shrine was destroyed at the instructions of Moshe Dayan in accordance with a 1950s Israeli policy of erasing Muslim historical sites within Israel. Around 2000, a modest marble mosque was constructed on the site by Mohammed Burhanuddin, an Indian Islamic leader of the Dawoodi Bohras.

Crusaders, Ayyubids, and Mamluks

During the Crusades, Asqalan (known to the Crusaders as Ascalon) was an important city due to its location near the coast and between the Crusader States and Egypt. In 1099, shortly after the Siege of Jerusalem, a Fatimid army that had been sent to relieve Jerusalem was defeated by a Crusader force at the Battle of Ascalon. The city itself was not captured by the Crusaders because of internal disputes among their leaders. This battle is widely considered to have signified the end of the First Crusade. As a result of military reinforcements from Egypt and a large influx of refugees from areas conquered by the Crusaders, Asqalan became a major Fatimid frontier post. The Fatimids utilized it to launch raids into the Kingdom of Jerusalem. Trade ultimately resumed between Asqalan and Crusader-controlled Jerusalem, though the inhabitants of Asqalan regularly struggled with shortages in food and supplies, necessitating the provision of goods and relief troops to the city from Egypt on several occasions each year. According to William of Tyre, the entire civilian population of the city was included in the Fatimid army registers. The Crusaders' capture of the port city of Tyre in 1134 and their construction of a ring of fortresses around the city to neutralize its threat to Jerusalem strategically weakened Asqalan. In 1150 the Fatimids fortified the city with fifty-three towers, as it was their most important frontier fortress. Three years later, after a seven-month siege, the city was captured by a Crusader army led by King Baldwin III of Jerusalem. The Fatimids secured the head of Husayn from its mausoleum outside the city and transported it to their capital Cairo. Ascalon was then added to the County of Jaffa to form the County of Jaffa and Ascalon, which became one of the four major seigneuries of the Kingdom of Jerusalem.

After the Crusader conquest of Jerusalem the six elders of the Karaite Jewish community in Ashkelon contributed to the ransoming of captured Jews and holy relics from Jerusalem's new rulers. The Letter of the Karaite elders of Ascalon, which was sent to the Jewish elders of Alexandria, describes their participation in the ransom effort and the ordeals suffered by many of the freed captives. A few hundred Jews, Karaites and Rabbanites, were living in Ashkelon in the second half of the 12th century, but moved to Jerusalem when the city was destroyed in 1191.

In 1187, Saladin took Ashkelon as part of his conquest of the Crusader States following the Battle of Hattin. In 1191, during the Third Crusade, Saladin demolished the city because of its potential strategic importance to the Christians, but the leader of the Crusade, King Richard I of England, constructed a citadel upon the ruins. Ashkelon subsequently remained part of the diminished territories of Outremer throughout most of the 13th century and Richard, Earl of Cornwall reconstructed and refortified the citadel during 1240–41, as part of the Crusader policy of improving the defences of coastal sites. The Egyptians retook Ashkelon in 1247 during As-Salih Ayyub's conflict with the Crusader States and the city was returned to Muslim rule. The Mamluk dynasty came into power in Egypt in 1250 and the ancient and medieval history of Ashkelon was brought to an end in 1270, when the Mamluk sultan Baybars ordered the citadel and harbour at the site to be destroyed. As a result of this destruction, the site was abandoned by its inhabitants and fell into disuse.

Archaeology
Beginning in the 1700s the site was visited, and occasionally drawn, by a number of adventurers and tourists. It was also often scavenged for building materials. The first known excavation occurred in 1815. The Lady Hester Stanhope dug there for two weeks using 150 workers. No real records were kept. In the 1800s some classical pieces from Askelon (though long thought to be from Thessaloniki) were sent to the Ottoman Museum. From 1920 to 1922 John Garstang and W. J. Phythian-Adams excavated on behalf of the Palestine Exploration Fund. They focused on two areas, one Roman and the other Philistine/Canaanite. In the years following, a number of salvage excavations were done by the Israel Antiquities Authority.

Modern excavation began in 1985 with the Leon Levy Expedition. Between then and 2006 seventeen seasons of work occurred, led by Lawrence Stager of Harvard University. In 2007 the next phase of excavation began under Daniel Master. It continued until 2016.

In the 1997 season a cuneiform table fragment was found, being a lexical list containing both Sumerian and Canaanite language columns. It was found in a Late Bronze Age II context, about 13th century BC.

In 2012 an Iron Age IIA Philistine cemetery was discovered outside the city. In 2013 200 graves were excavated of the estimated 1,200 the cemetery contained. Seven were stone built tombs.

One ostracon and 18 jar handles were recovered inscribed with the Cypro-Minoan script. The ostracon was of local material and dated to 12th to 11th century BC. Five of the jar handles were manufactured in coastal Lebanon, two in Cyprus, and one locally. Fifteen of the handles were found in an Iron I context and the rest in Late Bronze Age context.

See also
 List of cities of the ancient Near East

Bibliography

References

Amarna letters locations
Ancient sites in Israel
Canaanite cities
Crusade places
Hebrew Bible cities
Medieval sites in Israel
Philistine cities
Phoenician cities
Neolithic settlements
Bronze Age sites in Israel
Iron Age sites in Israel